Michael J. Cole is an American college baseball coach and former third baseman, who is the current associate head baseball coach for the Army Black Knights. Cole played college baseball at the University of Vermont from 1998 to 2001 for coach Bill Currier. He also served as the head coach of the NJIT Highlanders (2011–2012) and the Manhattan Jaspers (2018–2022)

Playing career
Cole attended Arlington High School in LaGrange, New York. Cole played for the school's varsity baseball team all four years. Cole then enrolled at the University of Vermont, to play college baseball for the Vermont Catamounts baseball team.

As a freshman at the University of Vermont in 1998, Cole had a .338 batting average, a .423 on-base percentage (OBP) and a .387 SLG.

As a sophomore in 1999, Cole batted .285 with a .380 SLG, 1 home run, and 37 RBIs.

In the 2000 season as a junior, Cole hit 4 home runs and 11 doubles.

Cole had his best season as a senior in 2001, leading the team in doubles (18), home runs (4), RBIs (40), batting average (.340) and slugging (.545). He was named Second Team All-America East Conference.

In 2011, Cole was elected into the University of Vermont Athletics Hall of Fame.

Coaching career
In 2002, Cole began his coaching career as an assistant at Vermont. In 2005, Cole accepted a position as an assistant with the Manhattan Jaspers baseball program. Cole returned to Vermont in 2009, but the team's program was folded at the conclusion of the season. Cole joined the Maine Black Bears baseball staff, re-joining Steve Trimper's staff who he worked for in 2005. On August 24, 2010, Cole was named the head coach for the NJIT Highlanders baseball program. Following a program record 25-win season at the NCAA Division I level, Cole was arrested and later fired by NJIT. On October 16, 2012, Cole was hired by his former coach, Bill Currier, on the Fairfield Stags baseball staff. On January 5, 2016, Cole was promoted to Associate head coach.

On August 17, 2017, Cole was named the head coach of the Manhattan Jaspers. In Cole's first season, the Jaspers improved their wins by 8, but failed to qualify for the 2018 Metro Atlantic Athletic Conference baseball tournament. On August 18, 2022, Cole resigned from his position as head coach of the Jaspers. He collected 90 wins in 5 seasons. He soon thereafter took the associate head coach position with the Army Black Knights.

Head coaching record

See also
 List of current NCAA Division I baseball coaches

References

External links
Manhattan Jaspers bio

Living people
Baseball third basemen
Army Black Knights baseball coaches
Vermont Catamounts baseball players
Vermont Catamounts baseball coaches
Manhattan Jaspers baseball coaches
Maine Black Bears baseball coaches
NJIT Highlanders baseball coaches
Fairfield Stags baseball coaches
Year of birth missing (living people)
Sportspeople from Poughkeepsie, New York
Baseball coaches from New York (state)